Nahum Leonard (December 11, 1876 - September 11, 1927) was one of the founders of the American college fraternity Kappa Delta Phi. He was born in Bridgewater, Massachusetts. While he attended Bridgewater State College, he was a member of the Normal Club. He was also at one time the president of the athletic association and chairman on the social committee for the Normal Club. As a member of Kappa Delta Phi, he served on the Executive Committee, Advisory Council and as Vice-President. 

After graduating from Bridgewater in 1902, he went on to be principal of Sanderson Academy in Ashfield, Massachusetts. He was Superintendent of Schools in North Andover, Massachusetts when he died on September 11, 1927 from angina pectoris immediate cardio sclerosis, and was laid to rest in the Mt. Prospect Cemetery in Bridgewater.

References

1876 births
1927 deaths
People from Bridgewater, Massachusetts
American educators
People from Ashfield, Massachusetts
People from North Andover, Massachusetts